Robert Cameron McEwen (January 5, 1920 – June 15, 1997) was a Republican member of the United States House of Representatives from New York.

Biography
McEwen was born on January 5, 1920, in Ogdensburg, St. Lawrence County, New York. He attended the University of Vermont and the Wharton School of the University of Pennsylvania,

He served in the United States Army Air Forces from 1942 to 1946, and attained the rank of Sergeant.

McEwen graduated from Albany Law School in 1947, was admitted to the bar and practiced in Ogdensburg.

He was elected to the New York State Senate on January 5, 1954, to fill the vacancy caused by the appointment of Paul D. Graves to the New York Supreme Court. McEwen remained in the State Senate until 1964, sitting in the 169th, 170th, 171st, 172nd, 173rd and 174th New York State Legislatures.

He was elected as a Republican to the 89th, 90th, 91st, 92nd, 93rd, 94th, 95th and 96th United States Congresses, holding office from January 3, 1965, to January 3, 1981.

He did not run for reelection in 1980. In 1981, McEwen was appointed by Ronald Reagan to the International Joint Commission, the United States-Canada body that advises the governments of the respective countries on issues related to boundary waters, and he served until 1989.

In 1982, the Custom House at Ogdensburg was named in his honor.

McEwen died in Ogdensburg on June 15, 1997. He was buried in Ogdensburg Cemetery.

References

External links

1920 births
1997 deaths
People from Ogdensburg, New York
Military personnel from New York (state)
University of Vermont alumni
Wharton School of the University of Pennsylvania alumni
Albany Law School alumni
United States Army personnel of World War II
Republican Party New York (state) state senators
United States Army Air Forces soldiers
Republican Party members of the United States House of Representatives from New York (state)
20th-century American politicians